Rodnikovy is a settlement in the urban okrug of Maykop, Russia. The population was 1,267 as of 2018. There are 11 streets.

Geography 
The settlement is located near the federal highway A-160, 18 km northwest of Maykop (the district's administrative centre) by road. Khanskaya is the nearest rural locality.

References 

Rural localities in Maykop Federal City